Larini is an Italian surname. Notable people with the surname include:

Andrea Larini (born 1968), Italian racing driver
Fabrizio Larini (born 1953), Italian sporting director
Nicola Larini (born 1964), Italian racing driver

See also
Larini, Iran (disambiguation)

Italian-language surnames